Raibliania is an extinct genus of tanystropheid archosauromorph discovered in the Calcare del Predil Formation in Italy. It lived during the Carnian stage of the Late Triassic and it was related to Tanystropheus. Raibliania is distinct from Tanystropheus due to some distinct features of the cervical vertebrae and teeth. The type species is Raibliania calligarisi, named in 2020. The holotype (MFSN 27532) consists of a partial post-cranial skeleton, with the known elements including vertebrae (sacral, cervical and dorsal; sans caudal), a single tooth, several ribs, gastralia and parts of the pelvis (ilium and pubis).

References

Tanystropheids
Prehistoric reptile genera
Carnian genera
Late Triassic reptiles of Europe
Triassic Italy
Fossils of Italy
Fossil taxa described in 2020